Simon Holden (born 9 March 1968) is an English former footballer who played as a midfielder.

References

1968 births
Living people
English footballers
Association football midfielders
Rochdale A.F.C. players
English Football League players